The 2019 League of Ireland First Division season was the 35th season of the League of Ireland First Division. The league began in February 2019 and concluded in October 2019. Shelbourne emerged as champions after beating title rivals Drogheda United 3-1 away from home on 13 September 2019, earning them promotion to the top flight for the first time since 2012.

Overview
The First Division has 10 teams. Each team plays each other three times for a total of 27 matches in the season.

Teams

Stadia and locations

Personnel and kits

Note: Flags indicate national team as has been defined under FIFA eligibility rules. Players may hold more than one non-FIFA nationality.

League table

Results

Matches 1–18
Teams play each other twice (once at home, once away).

Matches 19–27
Teams play each other once.

Season statistics

Top scorers

Play-offs

3rd vs. 4th-place play-off

2nd vs. Winner 3rd/4th play-off

Promotion/relegation playoff

See also

 2019 League of Ireland Premier Division
 2019 League of Ireland Cup

References

 
League of Ireland First Division seasons
2019 League of Ireland
2
Ireland
Ireland